The 2015–16 Verbandspokal, (English: 2015–16 Association Cup) consisted of twenty one regional cup competitions, the Verbandspokale, was the qualifying competition for the 2016–17 DFB-Pokal, the German Cup.

All clubs from the 3. Liga and below could enter the regional Verbandspokale, subject to the rules and regulations of each region. Clubs from the Bundesliga and 2. Bundesliga could not enter but were instead directly qualified for the first round of the DFB-Pokal. Reserve teams were not permitted to take part in the DFB-Pokal or the Verbandspokale. The precise rules of each regional Verbandspokal are laid down by the regional football association organising it.

All twenty one winners were qualified for the first round of the German Cup in the following season. Three additional clubs were also qualified for the first round of the German Cup, these being from the three largest state associations, Bavaria, Westphalia and Lower Saxony. The qualified teams are the runners-up of the Lower Saxony Cup. In Bavaria the best-placed Regionalliga Bayern non-reserve team is qualified for DFB-Pokal while in Westphalia a play-off is conducted to determine this club.

In February 2016 it was announced that German broadcaster ARD for the first time would show all 21 Verbandspokal finals live in a conference as well as live stream them and that all finals would be played on the same date, 28 May 2016. Some finals however were still scheduled for a different date.

Competitions
The finals of the 2015–16 Verbandspokal competitions:

Notes
Winners in bold

Clubs by league
The clubs qualified through the Verbandspokale for the 2016–17 DFB-Pokal by league:

Note
Clubs who qualified as runners-up in italics

References

External links
Official DFB website  The German Football Association
Fussball.de  Official results website of the DFB

2015–16 in German football cups
Verbandspokal seasons